The Euro Winners Cup (EWC) is an annual, continental beach soccer club competition contested between top-division European teams; the clubs that are their country's national league/cup champions (and, for some nations, one or more runners-up) from countries all across Europe take part. Organised by Beach Soccer Worldwide (BSWW), the championship is viewed as the sport's version of the UEFA Champions League in association football.

Featuring many of the world's best beach soccer players and clubs, the championship offers the strongest level of club competition on the old continent. It is therefore the most prestigious club beach soccer championship in Europe; the winners become continental champions.

Established in 2013 as a 20 team, five-day event, domestic beach soccer advancement in Europe has seen the tournament rapidly expand; in 2017, BSWW introduced a preliminary qualifying round, open to all clubs not automatically qualified for the competition proper. This has doubled the competition's length to 10 days, with over 50 clubs now participating; it takes place on multiple pitches in one location.  BSWW also began a women's edition in 2016.

Kristall of Saint Petersburg, Russia are the most successful club with four titles; Benfica Loures of Portugal are the current champions.

Organisation

Founding

The idea of the Euro Winners Cup had been "worked on for so much time", finally being founded on 9 October 2012 after an agreement was signed between organisers Beach Soccer Worldwide (BSWW) and the Comune of San Benedetto del Tronto to host the first edition in the Italian city the following spring.

At the signing, Gabino Renales (BSWW General Manager) said with increasing numbers of national leagues across Europe and the growing level of competitiveness within them, taking clubs onto an international scene was something the sport was demanding and hence the Euro Winners Cup was created to satisfy this craving.

Qualification
From 2013 to 2016, just one club from each European nation qualified – the champions of their highest level of beach soccer competition (be it a national league or knockout cup). The host country was also allowed to enter two additional clubs – the club based in the host city of the event and their national league/cup runners-up. The defending champions also earned automatic qualification regardless of domestic performance. Other runners-up were also sometimes accepted at the discretion of BSWW.

In 2017, the Preliminary Round was introduced – a qualifying stage open to any and all clubs that do not qualify automatically, regardless of where they placed in their nation's domestic league/cup competition. The successful clubs progress to the competition proper.

In 2019, BSWW overhauled the qualification system, adopting one based upon the UEFA coefficient ranking used in the UEFA Champions League. In this system, more than one club from stronger national leagues – those featuring higher quality clubs and players – qualify for the competition. The strength of each league is determined by analysing the performance of clubs in the EWC on a country-by-country basis over the previous five editions. Currently, three clubs (league champions, runners-up and third place) from the top six ranked countries qualify to the competition (as of 2020 these are: Portugal, Russia, Spain, Ukraine, Poland and Italy). Two clubs (league champions and runners-up) from the leagues ranked seventh, eighth and ninth qualify (as of 2020 these are: Turkey, Germany and Greece). And the remaining countries ranked tenth and lower continue to have just one club qualify – their league champions. The preliminary round remains in place, as do additional slots for the host club and defending champions.

In 2020 and 2021, qualification was completely abandoned due to health concerns and travel constraints caused by the COVID-19 pandemic meaning many clubs could not compete. The competition was opened up to simply any club in Europe that was able and willing to participate; the competition format was also altered accordingly for these editions.

Format
Currently, the tournament is a 10-day event taking place in late May or early June and typically operates under the following format:

Days 1–3: Preliminary round – the participating clubs are split into groups (usually of four) and compete in a round robin format.
Days 4–6: Group stage – the eight best ranking teams from the preliminary round proceed to join the automatic qualifiers in the group stage. The clubs are split into groups (usually of four) and compete in a round robin format.
Days 7–10: Knockout stage – the 32 best ranking teams from the group stage advance to the knockout stage. The teams compete in single-elimination matches; the round of 32 (day 7), the round of 16 and quarter-finals (day 8), semi-finals (9) and ending with the final (10). Consolation matches are also played to determine the final rankings involving the clubs knocked out of these rounds.

Results

Performance

Successful clubs

Successful nations

Awards

Appearances & performance timeline
The following is an appearance and performance timeline of the countries who have been represented by clubs at the Euro Winners Cup. It shows which countries were represented at each edition and by how many clubs. The colour of the cells indicates the furthest any of that country's clubs progressed in the competition in that edition, corresponding to the key below. Clubs which did not progress passed the preliminary round are not counted.

32 members of UEFA have been represented by at least one club in at least one edition to date.

Key

a. Not used in 2013.
b. Not used in 2013–18, 20, 22.

Timeline

See also
Women's Euro Winners Cup
Copa Libertadores de Beach Soccer
UEFA Futsal Champions League

References

External links
Beach Soccer Worldwide, official website

 
Beach soccer competitions
International association football competitions in Europe
2013 establishments in Europe
Recurring sporting events established in 2013
Multi-national professional sports leagues